Ivan Nikolaevich Nazarov (12 June 1906 – 30 July 1957) was an organic chemist from the former USSR.

Ivan Nikolaevich Nazarov has born on June 12, 1906. He was an organic chemist who started his scientific activities in 1931 at Leningrad State University. Nazarov published more than 300 scientific papers. In 1946, he was elected as a Corresponding Member of the Academy of Sciences of the USSR, and in 1953 he became an academician. Nazarov died 30 July 1957.
The Nazarov cyclization reaction is named after him.

References

1906 births
1957 deaths

Soviet chemists
20th-century chemists
Russian chemists
Full Members of the USSR Academy of Sciences
Members of the German Academy of Sciences at Berlin